The 2020–21 season was Vojvodina's 106th season in existence and the club's 15th competing in the Serbian SuperLiga.

Transfers

In

Out

Friendlies 
Due to the corona virus, Vojvodina did not play a single friendly match in summer 2020.

Competitions

Serbian SuperLiga

Regular season

League table

Results by matchday

Results

Serbian Cup

UEFA Europa League

Statistics

Squad statistics 

|-
! colspan=14 style="background:red; color:white; text-align:center;"| Goalkeepers

|-
! colspan=14 style="background:red; color:white; text-align:center;"| Defenders

|-
! colspan=14 style="background:red; color:white; text-align:center;"| Midfielders

|-
! colspan=14 style="background:red; color:white; text-align:center;"| Forwards

|-
! colspan=14 style="background:red; color:white; text-align:center;"| Players transferred out during the season
|-

Goal scorers 

Last updated: 20 May 2021

Clean sheets 

Last updated: 20 May 2021

Disciplinary record 

Last updated: 20 May 2021

Game as captain 

Last updated: 20 May 2021

References 

FK Vojvodina seasons
Serbian football clubs 2020–21 season